Beaumont Hospital is a large teaching hospital located in Beaumont, Dublin, Ireland. It is managed by RCSI Hospitals - one of the hospital groups established by the Health Service Executive. Its academic partner is the Royal College of Surgeons in Ireland.

St. Joseph's Hospital (Raheny) is also under the management of the Beaumont Hospital Board.

History
The planning for the hospital, which was commissioned to replace the Richmond Surgical Hospital and the Jervis Street Hospital began in 1977. The design was based on the scheme for the Cork University Hospital. It was built at a cost of €52.7 million and was officially opened on 29 November 1987. Beaumont Hospital took over management of St. Joseph's Hospital in Raheny in August 2004.

The Dublin Brain Bank, a research facility for post mortem storage and examination of brain tissue, opened at Beaumont Hospital in October 2008. A new cystic fibrosis unit opened at the hospital in December 2010 and a new radiation therapy unit for cancer treatment was established at the hospital in 2012.

The Ashlin Centre, a new adult psychiatric facility, was built and opened to patients in 2014.

The new RCSI Smurfit Building was opened on the Beaumont Hospital campus in 2018, built at a cost of €9.5 million.

Services
Beaumont Hospital employs approximately 3,000 staff. It provides 820 beds, of which 631 are in-patient acute beds, while 110 are reserved for acute day cases. A further 10 beds are designated for in-patient psychiatric care.

The hospital provides regional cancer services to the North East Region of the Republic of Ireland and was designated as one of Ireland's eight Cancer Centres of Excellence in 2007. The Smurfit Education & Research Centre, established in 2000, is the principal clinical research centre on the site of Beaumont Hospital.

Beaumont is the principal undergraduate and postgraduate medical training and research centre associated with the Royal College of Surgeons in Ireland with whom it shares its campus. It also provides clinical training for undergraduate nursing students from Dublin City University.

It is the Designated Cancer Centre and the Regional Treatment Centre for Ear, Nose and Throat, and Gastroenterology. It is also the National Referral Centre for Neurosurgery and Neurology, Renal Transplantation, and Cochlear Implantation.

References

External links

Royal College of Surgeons in Ireland website
Beaumont Hospital at Health Service Executive website

Hospital buildings completed in 1987
Teaching hospitals in Dublin (city)
Teaching hospitals of the Royal College of Surgeons in Ireland
Education in Dublin (city)
Hospitals established in 1987
Health Service Executive hospitals
Voluntary hospitals
1987 establishments in Ireland